Mohammed Al-Kunaydiri (born 11 October 2000), is a Saudi Arabian professional footballer who plays as a left back for Abha.

Career statistics

Club

Notes

References

External links
 

2000 births
Living people
Association football fullbacks
Saudi Arabian footballers
Saudi Arabia youth international footballers
Al Hilal SFC players
Al-Adalah FC players
Abha Club players
Saudi Professional League players
Saudi First Division League players